Baker King is a Philippine drama television series based on South Korean series King of Baking, Kim Takgu (also known the Philippines as The Baker King) starring Mark Neumann, Shaira Mae, Akihiro Blanco, and Inah Estrada. The series premiered on TV5 on 18 May 2015.

It is the first Korean drama adaptation to air on TV5. This is also TV5's first dramaserye since Beki Boxer ended its run July 2014 aside from Wattpad Presents which features a new story every week.

Plot
Takgu is the illegitimate son of Johnny Lee, president of Lee Han Seong Bread Factory.  Because of this, the Lee family does not accept him.  After his mother is kidnapped, Takgu leaves the Lee home and spends his teenage years looking for her while living on the streets and surviving though odd jobs.  He ends up at the famous Lucky Bakeshop where he will unexpectedly face off against his half-brother, Michael.  But in addition to learning how to become the best baker in the Philippines, Takgu will learn about life and love.

Cast

Main cast
 Mark Neumann as Takgu San Miguel
 Akihiro Blanco as Michael Lee
 Inah Estrada as Eunice Bustillo
 Shaira Mae as Sunshine R. Gatchalian

Supporting cast

Lee family
 Boots Anson-Roa as Lee Hye Yeong
 Jackie Lou Blanco as Irene Lee
 Yul Servo as Manager Henry
 Raymond Bagatsing as President Johnny Lee
 Malak So Shdifat as Celine Lee
 Nicole Estrada as Aliyah "Ally" Lee

The bakery
 Joonee Gamboa as Master Javier Robles
 Allan Paule as Rey Gatchalian
 Anna Feleo as Peeta Gatchalian 
 Ian De Leon as Victor
 Mon Confiado as Nando
 Sergio Garcia as Tiny
 Adolph Reyes as Bimbo

Other characters
 Diana Zubiri as Sonia San Miguel
 Via Antonio as Candice
 Vangie Labalan as Vising
 Patricia Ysmael as Monet
 Antoinette Garcia as Chinggay

Special participation
 Nourish Icon Lapuz as young Takgu
 Laurence Yuan Carrido as young Michael
 John Manalo as teenage Michael
 Kryshee Grengia as young Ally
 Jim Pebangco as Gardo
 Nanding Josef as Roger
 Jade Lopez as Lara
 Sheng Belmonte as Ruby
 Luke Jickain as James
 Jacob Benedicto as Alex
 Menggie Cobarrubias as Attorney Mendoza
 Karla Pambid as Aling Dolor
 Noel Urbano as Mang Cesar
 Franchesca Salcedo as young Celine

Overview

Origin

King of Baking, Kim Takgu is a Korean drama series broadcast on KBS2 in 2010 starring Yoon Shi-yoon, Joo Won, Eugene and Lee Young-ah. It was declared a "national drama" after garnering high ratings, including topping 50.0% for its finale episode.

In 2011, GMA Network aired the series, dubbed in Tagalog, under the title The Baker King. For most of its run, it was the highest rated and most watched show in the Philippines. GMA re-aired the drama on weekends in late-2011 and into 2012.

Production
At its December 2013 trade launch to potential advertisers, TV5 announced it had acquired the Philippine adaptation rights to the drama.  Baker King was revealed as one of two Korean drama adaptations (along with My Fair Lady) to air on the network in 2014.

TV5 talent Vin Abrenica was initially reported to have either been cast as the lead or second lead on the series. But in March 2014, a story published in the Journal group of daily tabloids reported that TV5 was interested in "borrowing" GMA talent Derrick Monasterio for Baker King in which he would star with TV5 talents Ritz Azul and Eula Caballero.

There would be no news about the project until April 2015 when TV5 announced Baker King would premiere on 18 May with a cast including Boots Anson-Roa, Akihiro Blanco, Shaira Mae, and Inah Estrada. Mark Neumann was cast in the title role, contrary to what had been reported.  Abrenica admitted to being "hurt" after learning he had not been cast on the series.

TV5 entertainment head Wilma Galvante said the Filipino adaptation would include Filipino "local flavor" based on the book Panaderia by Amy Uy which is a study of various local breads from different parts of the Philippines.

The series uses several songs from the original Korean soundtrack of Baker King Kim Tak Goo as well as one original Filipino song performed and composed by Ogie Alcasid entitled "Saranghaeyo."

References

External links
Official Website

2015 Philippine television series debuts
2015 Philippine television series endings
TV5 (Philippine TV network) drama series
Philippine drama television series
Philippine television series based on South Korean television series
Filipino-language television shows